The Sushi Economy by Sasha Issenberg is a nonfiction book about sushi and globalization. The Sushi Economy uses the booming business, culture, and cuisine of raw fish to examine how the integration of local economies through trade works in practice. The book takes the form of a global travelogue ranging from Atlantic bluefin tuna fishermen in Gloucester, Massachusetts, to Japan's Tsukiji fish market in Tokyo, to tuna pirates in the Mediterranean, to an Austin, Texas sushi bar, to the global restaurant empire of Nobu Matsuhisa and the tuna ranchers of Port Lincoln, South Australia . The book synthesized widely available information on the global impact of Japan's appetite for seafood.

References 
 How Sushi Went Global, by Theodore C. Bestor, 2000, Foreign Policy. 
 Tsukiji: The Fish Market at the Center of the World, by  Theodore C. Bestor, 2004, University of California Press. ; 
The Sushi Economy, by Sasha Issenberg, 2008. 
 Book review.
 Giant Bluefin, by Douglas Whynott, 1996, North Point Press.

Books about globalization
Sushi
Books about food and drink
Books by Sasha Issenberg